A Naturschutzgebiet (abbreviated NSG) is a category of protected area (nature reserve) within Germany's Federal Nature Conservation Act (the Bundesnaturschutzgesetz or BNatSchG).
Although often translated as 'Nature Reserve' in English, the Federal Agency for Nature Conservation (BfN) refers to them as 'Nature Conservation Areas'. It meets the criteria of an IUCN Category IV Habitat and Species Management Area.

Points of law 
The use of the term Naturschutzgebiet or terms that could be confused with it for anything other than the legally protected areas is forbidden under this law.

Signage 
Because legal restrictions are placed on activity within German nature reserves they have to be signed on the ground. Only by this means can e.g. walkers know that they are entering a nature reserve and may not e.g. leave the tracks and paths. For historical reasons there is no standard sign used across Germany.

Nature reserves in the "old states" of the Federal Republic of Germany are marked by green signs with the silhouette of a white-tailed eagle. In the new federal states of the former East Germany they are marked with a pentagonal yellow sign bearing an image of a long-eared owl. The reunification of Germany the 36th Environmental Minister's Conference in 1991 recommended the use of the owl symbol in future in the whole of Germany to designate nature reserves. This recommendation was not universally adopted by the states, in whom the jurisdiction for conservation policy was vested. For that reason there are de facto three different signs being used alongside one another in Germany today.

Schleswig-Holstein, Mecklenburg-Western Pomerania, Brandenburg, Saxony-Anhalt, Thuringia and Saxony use the owl on a pentagon, Saxony-Anhalt employing a white background instead of the usual yellow.
Berlin, Lower Saxony and Bremen use the owl in a green triangle.
Hamburg, North Rhine-Westphalia, Hesse, Rhineland-Palatinate, the Saarland, Baden-Württemberg and Bavaria use the white-tailed eagle in a green triangle.

Sites 

At the end of 2008 there were 8,413 nature reserves in Germany with a total area of 1,271,582 hectares. That corresponds to 3.6% of the area of Germany. The lowest percentage areas are in the states of Hesse (1.8%) and Rhineland-Palatinate (1.9%). The percentage coverage in the old and new states is identical. About 60% of all nature reserves are smaller than  50 hectares in area. In such small areas experts say that the achievement of conservation goals is at risk, because negative influences from the surrounding area cannot be sufficiently mitigated. The number and size of nature reserves has increased considerably in recent decades. In 1995 there were only 5,314 Naturschutzgebiete in Germany with an area of 6,845 km2. Even the current coverage is seen by experts as too low to preserve the variety of species in Germany.

The following lists detail the nature reserves by state:
Baden-Württemberg
Bavaria
Berlin
Brandenburg
Bremen
Hamburg
Hesse
Mecklenburg-Western Pomerania
Lower Saxony
North Rhine-Westphalia
Rhineland-Palatinate
Saarland
Saxony
Saxony-Anhalt
Schleswig-Holstein
Thuringia

See also 
 Nature parks in Germany

References

External links